Candice is a given name and a variant spelling of the name Candace.

People 

Notable people with the name include:

Candice Accola, American actress (The Vampire Diaries)
Candice Carty-Williams, British writer
Candice Bergen, American actress (Murphy Brown)
Candice Bergen, Canadian politician
Candice Bridge, American chemist
Candice Farmer, British underwater fashion photographer
Candice Glover, American singer
Candice Hillebrand (also known as Candîce), singer from South Africa
Candice Michelle, American professional wrestler, model, actress with WWE
Candice Miller, American politician
Candice Night, American musician, lead singer for Blackmore’s Night
Candice Odgers, American psychologist
Candice Patton, American actress
Candice Swanepoel, South African model known for her work with Victoria's Secret
Candice Warner, Australian ironwoman and surf lifesaver
 Candice Lerae (born 1985), WWE Professional wrestler

Fictional characters 

Candice Wilmer, in Heroes
Candice (MÄR), recurring antagonist in the manga and anime series MÄR
Candice (Pokémon), character of the Pokémon universe
Candice White Ardlay, main character of Candy Candy
Candice Catnipp is a Sternritter who has the epithet "T" for "The Thunderbolt" in the Bleach manga